Micro Focus Quality Center, formerly known as HP Quality Center is a quality management software offered by Micro Focus, who acquired the software division of Hewlett Packard Enterprise in 2017, with many capabilities acquired from Mercury Interactive Corporation. Quality Center offers software quality assurance, including requirements management, test management and business process testing for IT and application environments. Quality Center is a component of the Micro Focus Application Lifecycle Management software set.

Product packaging
Micro Focus Quality Center is available in the following editions:
 Community
 Express
 Enterprise
Community and Express editions are designed for entry-level software quality assurance organizations. The Enterprise edition, originally called Mercury TestDirector for Quality Center, is for software quality assurance organizations that manage medium to large releases. For large and global organizations, Micro Focus Application Lifecycle Management incorporates the capabilities of Quality Center Enterprise Tracking, Enterprise Release Management and Asset Sharing for requirements management through application delivery.
Quality Center is also available as a Software-as-a-Service offering.

System requirements
Micro Focus Quality Center runs on the Windows platforms with an Internet Explorer browser. In combination with the ALM Explorer Add-in, it can be executed as a normal desktop application.

Micro Focus has published information regarding about ALM's server-side and client-side system requirements, and are updated periodically as new versions and patches are released.

References

Software quality
Software testing tools
Bug and issue tracking software
Quality Center